The Association of Arab and European Universities (AEUA) is a university association based in The Hague, Netherlands.

The AEAU encourages links between European and Arab universities. It was established in 1998 by the Lutfia Rabbani Foundation with the main objective if aiding collaboration between universities in Arab and European countries at the university, faculty, and departmental levels. Ultimate goal is to develop human resources and promote understanding between cultures and exchanges between the civil societies involved. In 2000, the AEUA was incorporated formally under Dutch law with support from the Association of Arab Universities located in Amman, Jordan and the European University Association located in Brussels, Belgium. Both these organizations have representatives on the Board of the AEUA.

See also
 Arab League
 Arab world
 Association of Arab Universities (AARU)
 European University Association (EUA)
 List of Arab organizations

References

External links
 AEUA website

1998 establishments in the Netherlands
Higher education organisations based in Europe
Organizations established in 1998
Professional associations based in the Netherlands
Organisations based in The Hague
International college and university associations and consortia
Arab organizations